Archibald the Koala is a 1998 British animated children's television series produced by Millimages in association with HiT Entertainment. The show began in September 1998 and starting airing on ITV on its children's block CITV. The show itself is based on the books written by Paul Cox. The show was made in both French and English versions.

In the United States, the show was seen on Cartoon Network's international showcase program aimed at pre-schoolers, Small World.

Plot
This series is set on a secluded island called "Rastepappe", which is populated by anthropomorphic Koalas and Badgers. Its city, Koalaville is filled with various strange characters including a nervous mayor, a hopeless inventor, a lazy fisherman, a short-tempered chef and a bossy painter. The stress of the mayor's job causes him to have trouble with migraines, or "meeegranes" as he still pronounces it.

There are always strange things going on in Rastepappe, so Archibald, the trustworthy detective, is put on the job.

Characters
 Archibald the detective — the detective and main character. Voiced by Richard Griffiths.
 Agatha — a novel writer and Archibald's wife. Voiced by Kate Robbins.
 Archduke — the mayor of the town. He is the king. He speaks English with an English accent. He has the same voice as Nelson the Elephant from 64 Zoo Lane. Voiced by Keith Wickham.
 Jozette — Archduke's wife. She is the queen. She speaks Victorian with an Victorian accent. She has the same voices as Madam Owl from Pablo the Little Red Fox and Esmeralda the Snake from 64 Zoo Lane. Voiced by Adrienne Posta.
 Giovanni — an opera singer. He speaks Italian with an Italian accent. Voiced by Dan Russell.
 John Dory — a fisherman and Iris Dory's husband. He speaks American with an American accent. Voiced by Dan Russell.
 Iris Dory — a florist and John Dory's wife. She speaks Irish with an Irish accent. Voiced by Kate Robbins.
 Edison — an inventor. He speaks a Royal British with a Royal British accent. Voiced by Keith Wickham.
 Marie — an architect and painter. She has the same voice as Pablo, Poppy and Pumpkin's Mom from Pablo the Little Red Fox. Voiced by Adrienne Posta.
 Sullivan — a printer, journalist and Gazette's husband. He speaks Australian with an Australian accent. Voiced by Bob Saker.
 Gazette — Sullivan's wife. Voiced by Adrienne Posta.
 Soufflé — the island's chef. He speaks French with an French accent. He has the same voice as Hercule Mustache the Walrus from 64 Zoo Lane. Voiced by Bob Saker.
 Miss Julie — school teacher and astrologer. She also speaks English with an English accent too. Voiced by Kate Robbins.

There is a population of approximately 5 hundred other civilians on Rastepappe.

Episodes

Series 1 (1998)
 1. The Dragon 04 September 1998
 2. The Meteorite 11 September 1998
 3. The Rugby-Basket Mystery 18 September 1998
 4. A Hazardous Fishing Contest 25 September
 5. The Missing Boat 02 October 1998
 6. The Heatwave 09 October 1998
 7. Archduke's Statue 16 October 1998
 8. The Haunted House 23 October 1998
 9. A Star is Born 30 October 1998
 10. The Brass Band 06 November 1998
 11. Archduke's Amnesia 13 November 1998
 12. Strange Vibrations 20 November 1998
 13. The New Restaurant 27 November 1998
 14. A Hapless Birthday 04 December 1998
 15. Read about Tomorrow, Today 11 December 1998
 16. The Flower And The Magician 18 December 1998

Series 2 (1999)
 17. What’s White And White All Over? 19 August 1999
 18. The Invasion 26 August 1999
 19. The Fire Fighters 02 September 1999
 20. The Floating Island Mystery 09 September 1999
 21. Great Renovations 16 September 1999
 22. Archduke's Cockatoo  23 September 1999
 23. The Lighthouse of Rastepappe 30 September 1999
 24. The Overworked Printer 21 October 1999
 25. The Snow Cannon 28 October 1999
 26. The Flower Thief 04 November 1999
 27. A Whale Song 11 November 1999
 28. The Very Greedy Sleepwalker 18 November 1999
 29. The World of Giants 25 November 1999
 30. Edison's Clock 02 December 1999
 31. The Sea Monster 09 December 1999
 32. The Treasure Hunt 16 December 1999
 33. An Ultra-Modern Town Hall 16 December 1999
 34. Stop That Train! 23 December 1999
 35. A Mysterious Rescuer 30 December 1999

Series 3 (2000)
 36. The Messenger 03 April 2000
 37. The Dynamic Dynamo 10 April 2000
 38. The Big Show 17 April 2000
 39. The Lucky Charm 24 April 2000
 40. The Misunderstanding 01 May 2000
 41. The Umbrellas of Rastepappe 08 May 2000
 42. The Big Twister 15 May 2000
 43. The Machine from the Sky 22 May 2000
 44. The Fake Necklace 29 May 2000
 45. Pizza Gazette 02 June 2000 
 46. The Ambulance 09 June 2000 
 47. The Musical Extravaganza 16 June 2000
 48. A Detective Goes Camping 23 June 2000
 49. Edison's Trophy 30 June 2000
 50. The Giant Mole 07 July 2000
 51. The Waxworks of Rastepappe 14 July 2000
 52. Archibald's Holiday 21 July 2000

DVD Releases
There is only one volume for every Archibald the Koala season. (1-6)

References

External links
 
 Archibald the Koala on millimages.com
 
 Magna Pacific

1990s French animated television series
1998 French television series debuts
French children's animated television series
French television shows based on children's books
Television series about koalas
Television series by Mattel Creations
ITV children's television shows
Television series set on fictional islands